Scolca is a commune in the Haute-Corse department of France on the island of Corsica.

It is part of the canton of Golo-Morosaglia.

Geography

Population

See also
Communes of the Haute-Corse department

References

Communes of Haute-Corse